Badara Sarr (born 11 February 1994) is a Senegalese footballer.

Biography
Born in Thiès, Senegal, Sarr was a youth product of Italian football club Parma. In July 2013 Sarr was signed by Lega Pro Prima Divisione club Gubbio in a temporary deal. After spending 7 months with the first team of Parma, on 3 February 2015 Sarr left for Catanzaro.

On 21 July 2015 Sarr was signed by Maceratese.

On 28 January 2016 Sarr was signed by Lumezzane in a temporary deal, with Francesco Potenza moved to opposite direction outright.

References

External links

Senegalese footballers
Parma Calcio 1913 players
A.S. Gubbio 1910 players
U.S. Catanzaro 1929 players
F.C. Lumezzane V.G.Z. A.S.D. players
Serie C players
Association football midfielders
Expatriate footballers in Italy
Senegalese expatriate footballers
Senegalese expatriate sportspeople in Italy
Sportspeople from Thiès
1994 births
Living people